HDK (Hate, Death, Kill) is a musical project of Dutch guitarist Sander Gommans, best known as member, vocalist and one of the main composers of the now dissolved symphonic metal band After Forever.

History
Sander Gommans founded the band as a side project of his career as guitarist and vocalist in the Dutch band After Forever in 2005, along with bass player Peter Vink and drummer Arien van Weesenbeek, who is now the drummer for Epica. Gommans' purpose was to produce music more extreme than After Forever's usual symphonic metal, which needed a different output. Gommans' activities as art teacher and member of After Forever and his poor health condition slowed down the creative process of the band, until 2008. With the interruption of After Forever activities, HDK was able to finally produce its first full-length album System Overload, which was released on 23 February 2009 on the label Season of Mist. The album featured many guest singers and instrumentalists.

In 2014, HDK released their second album called Serenades of the Netherworld, with a fixed line-up composed of Gommans on guitar and bass, Amanda Somerville and Geert Kroes on vocals, Koen Herfst on drums and Uri Dijk and Erik van Ittersum on keyboards, along with some guest instrumentalists.

Style
The music style is aggressive and amalgamates elements of classic metal, melodic death metal, and modern thrash metal, as well as other stylistic influences given by female vocals and progressive rock elements.

Members
Current members
Sander Gommans (ex-After Forever, Trillium, Kiske/Somerville) - growls, guitars, bass guitar
Guests
Vocalists
Amanda Somerville (Trillium, Avantasia, Kiske/Somerville) - female vocals
Andre Matos (ex-Angra, Shaman, Virgo) - clean male vocals
Jos Severens (Sustain) - clean male vocals
Patrick Savelkoul (Callenish Circle) - screams, grunts
Paul Niessen (I Witness) - raps
Mike Scheijen (37 Stabwoundz) - screams
Geert Kroes (Dead Man's Curse, BlindSight) - clean male vocals, growls
Instrumentalists
Joost van den Broek (Sun Caged, After Forever) - keyboards
Arjen Anthony Lucassen (Ayreon) - guitar solo
Marcel Coenen (Sun Caged) - guitar solo
Bastiaan Kuiper (Engine of Pain) - guitar solo
Ariën van Weesenbeek (ex-God Dethroned, Epica, MaYaN) - drums
Koen Herfst (Bagga Bownz, I Chaos, Dew-Scented, Armin van Buuren) - drums
Peter Vink - bass guitar
Uri Dijk (Textures) - keyboards
Erik van Ittersum (Insomnia, Ethereal) - keyboards

Discography
System Overload (2009)
Serenades of the Netherworld (2014)

References

External links
 Official MySpace
 Metal-Archives Profile

Dutch heavy metal musical groups
Dutch gothic metal musical groups
Musical groups established in 2005
Dutch melodic death metal musical groups
Season of Mist artists